Thanjavur Nisumbasuthani Temple is a Hindu temple in Thanjavur in the Thanjavur district of Tamil Nadu, India.

Thanjavur Palace Devasthanam comprises 88 temples. They are maintained and administered by the Hindu Religious and Charitable Endowments Department of the Government of Tamil Nadu. This is one of the temples of Palace Devasthanam.

Location 
The temple is situated in Poomal Ravuthan Kovil Street in East Gate at Thanjavur.
coordinates =

Presiding deity
The presiding deity is Nisumbasuthani. She is also known as Vada Badrakali and Rakukala Kaliamman. She is in sitting posture. According to Thiruvalangadu copper plates during the Chola period this temple was set up. The deity is of 6' height. She is facing north. She is holding sula on her hand. Her left leg is found on the head of asura. Her long hair is looked like fire,  right ear wearing corpse, left ear with kuzhai, just hanging breasts, snake around the body etc. are found.

Kumbhabhishekham 
The Mahasamprokshanam also known as Kumbhabhishekham of the temple was held after 55 years. It was held on 23 June 2016. Worshipping of the temple is from 6.00 a.m. to 12.000 noon and from 4.00 to 8.30 p.m.

References

External links

Kumbhabhishekham 23 June 2016

Hindu temples in Thanjavur district
Shakti temples